Azab may refer to:
 Āzāb or Azaw, Afghanistan
 Azab, Khuzestan, Iran
 Azab, West Azerbaijan, Iran
 Azap or Azab, irregular light infantry of the Ottoman Army